Al-Rafid is a village in the Rashaya District, in the southeastern area of the Beqaa Governorate in Lebanon. Its population is estimated to be 3,000. Its inhabitants are predominantly Sunni Muslims. The village has two mosques, two schools, two pharmacies, and a telecommunications facility.

Geography
The oldest part of the village lies halfway up Mount Baaloul (Jabal Baaloul) on the eastern slope. It is widely accepted by the inhabitants of the town that the town was originally located on the top of the mountain but was re-located after a civil strife had subsided over 400 years ago. Neighboring localities include Bire, Mhaydseh, Kherbet Rouha, and Mdoukha. From Al-Rafid, Jabal Al-Sheikh (Mount Hermon) can be seen with its majestic snow-capped peak.

History
In 1838, Eli Smith noted Al-Rafid,'s population as being predominantly  Sunni Muslim.

The village was occupied first by PLO forces in the late 1970s, then by Israeli forces in the early 1980s. Before Israel's invasion, the town suffered from Israeli warplane attacks. In one incident, the school was bombed, killing a mother and her four children. Israel said that the school was being used as a base for PLO forces.

References

Bibliography

External links
Rafid, Localiban

Rafid
Sunni Muslim communities in Lebanon